Standings and results for Group 3 of the UEFA Euro 1988 qualifying tournament.

Group 3 consisted of East Germany, defending champions France, Iceland, Norway and USSR. Group winners were USSR, who finished two points clear of second-placed East Germany.

Final table

Results

Goalscorers

References
UEFA Page
RSSSF Page

Group 3
1986–87 in French football
1986–87 in East German football
1987–88 in East German football
1986 in Norwegian football
1987 in Norwegian football
1986 in Icelandic football
1987 in Icelandic football
1986 in Soviet football
1987 in Soviet football
Soviet Union at UEFA Euro 1988